Golden Kids English High School is a high school located in Amravati, Maharashtra, India.

References

External links
 Official Facebook site

Education in Amravati
High schools and secondary schools in Maharashtra